The Gallery of Matica Srpska is one of the largest and oldest galleries in Serbia. It is located in the central zone of Novi Sad, next to Pavle Beljanski Memorial Collection.

The Gallery was established on the 14th of October 1847, with contributions from Sava Tekelija who left a valuable family portrait collection to the Matica Srpska, and other Serb merchants who made endowments and donations to the gallery.

The building of Gallery of Matica Srpska was declared a Monument of Culture of Great Importance in 1979.

The Gallery of Matica Srpska has acted as an independent institution apart from Matica Srpska since 1958. Collections in The Gallery of Matica Srpska mostly consists of paintings from all periods of the national history of art.

Gallery

References

Protected Monuments of Culture
Office buildings in Serbia
Museums in Serbia